Painteria is a genus of flowering plants in the family Fabaceae. It belongs to the mimosoid clade of the subfamily Caesalpinioideae. The genus is native to Mexico.

Species include:
Painteria elachistophylla
Painteria leptophylla
Painteria nitida
Painteria revoluta

References

Mimosoids
Fabaceae genera